Sverre Brandhaug (born 22 June 1959) is a retired football player from Norway, who played as a central midfield from 1981 to 1991 for Rosenborg BK in the Norwegian Premier League. He also played for Trondheims-Ørn SK and Strindheim IL. Brandhaug played 35 times for Norway and scored 2 goals.

References

Strindheim IL players
Rosenborg BK players
Norwegian footballers
Norway international footballers
Eliteserien players
Sportspeople from Trondheim
1959 births
Living people
Association football midfielders